Ben Daley (born 27 June 1988) is a former national representative ’Wallabies’ rugby union footballer who played professionally for the Melbourne Rebels. Daley also previously played for the Queensland Reds and Western Force. His playing position was prop. Daley now works as Head of Legal, Compliance and Venue Operations at the St Kilda Football Club.

Rugby career
In 2008 Daley joined the Queensland Reds as a rookie and in the same year played for the Australia U20 side. He was selected for the 2009 squad and was selected as run on LH prop in 12 of the 13 matches played by the Queensland Reds 2010 Super 14 team, making his debut for Australia later that year against England, becoming Wallaby No. 842.

In 2011 Daley started at loose head prop in the Super Rugby Championship winning Queensland Reds team, beating the Canterbury Crusaders to win their first title of the professional era.
 
In 2015, Daley founded 'Be Great Do Good,' an initiative aimed at promoting the idea that an athlete can be great on the field, whilst doing good off it. Using his scrum cap as a vehicle to drive the campaign, Daley supported a different charity each week during the Super Rugby season, with the logos and colors unique to that charity being emblazoned on his headgear. The one-of-a-kind headgear was then used by the charity to raise funds for their cause.

Further in 2015, he graduated with a Bachelor of Laws from Bond University.

Super Rugby statistics

References

from aru.com.au
from couriermail.com.au

External links
Reds profile
Wallabies profile

1988 births
Australian rugby union players
Australia international rugby union players
Queensland Reds players
Rugby union props
Rugby union players from Sydney
Living people
Western Force players
Melbourne Rebels players
Queensland Country (NRC team) players